Mark Borthwick is a British photographer now living in Brooklyn, New York. His photos are often minimal and crisp, yet somewhat 'blown-out' in terms of colour saturation. He has contributed to many publications, including Vogue, George,  Purple, and Index. He was also responsible for all the album artwork and promotional material behind Passion Pit's 2012 album "Gossamer". He is currently married to fashion designer Maria Cornejo.

External links
 Interview with Fecal Face (August 2006)
 Interview with Sede magazine (November 2006)
 Time Out article (October 2008)

Photographers from New York City
Living people
Year of birth missing (living people)
British emigrants to the United States